Inam-ur Rahman (born 23 November 1943) is an Indian field hockey player. He competed at the 1968 Summer Olympics, winning the bronze medal.

References

External links
 

1943 births
Living people
Indian male field hockey players
Olympic field hockey players of India
Field hockey players at the 1968 Summer Olympics
Olympic bronze medalists for India
Olympic medalists in field hockey
Medalists at the 1968 Summer Olympics
Field hockey players from Bhopal